Milan Janković (born April 13, 1984) is a Bosnian-Herzegovinian retired footballer.

Club career
His former club is SKN St. Pölten. Janković played a left attacking midfielder. He signed with Bulgarian side Lokomotiv in July 2008.

He spent the remainder of his career in the Austrian lower leagues.

References

1984 births
Living people
People from Gradiška, Bosnia and Herzegovina
Association football midfielders
Bosnia and Herzegovina footballers
Favoritner AC players
SC Austria Lustenau players
SKN St. Pölten players
PFC Lokomotiv Mezdra players
SC-ESV Parndorf 1919 players
DSV Leoben players
Wiener Sport-Club players
FC Waidhofen/Ybbs players
Austrian Football Bundesliga players
First Professional Football League (Bulgaria) players
Austrian Regionalliga players
Austrian Landesliga players
Austrian 2. Landesliga players
Bosnia and Herzegovina expatriate footballers
Expatriate footballers in Austria
Bosnia and Herzegovina expatriate sportspeople in Austria
Expatriate footballers in Bulgaria
Bosnia and Herzegovina expatriate sportspeople in Bulgaria